Jardín Botánico is a sector in the city of Santo Domingo in the Distrito Nacional of the Dominican Republic. Jardín Botánico attracts most visitors with its lush botanical garden Dr. Rafael Ma.

Sources 
Distrito Nacional sectors

References 

Populated places in Santo Domingo